Picard Surgelés is a French food company specializing in the manufacture and retail distribution of frozen products. It began as Les Glacières de Fontainebleau in 1906. Picard Surgelés has almost 900 retail stores in France. In 2014, French consumers voted Picard as their favorite brand.

The company produces about 700 different products, which are sold exclusively under the Picard brand.

History
Picard began as Les Glacières de Fontainebleau in 1906. Raymond Picard founded it as an ice-supply business, to provide households with blocks of ice prior to the advent of home refrigerators. Arnaud Decelle bought the business in 1974 and began to sell frozen vegetables from a store in Paris. Today, Picard is owned by jointly by Aryzta (49%) and Lion Capital (51%), and commands about 20 percent of the French frozen food market.

In October 2019, Aryzta's board agreed to an offer from the Tunisian investment company Groupe Zouari to divest 43% of its stake in Picard for a sum of €156 million, with Aryzta retaining a 4.5% stake in the business. 

Cathy Collart Geiger replaced Philippe Pauze as Executive President in June 2020.

Retail operations

Although Picard retail stores offer some non-frozen food options, almost all of the products in each shop are frozen food. The variety of the food is a major selling point, which beyond frozen fruit, vegetables, meat, and fish include options such as minced ginger, various chopped herbs, sauteed shallots, peeled chestnuts, wild mushrooms, pumpkin puree, and various sauces such as beurre blanc. Frozen prepared foods are also large sellers, including items like croissants, brioches, salads, galettes, hors d'oeuvres, entrees, and various desserts. In 2016, Picard's best-selling item was extra-fine green beans, of which they daily sold . Shoppers use insulated bags to carry products home.

Supply chain and new products
Picard owns much of the production chain from the raw ingredients to the final products and enjoys a close relationship with farmers, and so chooses not to include many of the additives and preservatives that other frozen food retailers include. Picard introduces around 200 new food options every year to keep consumers happy.

References

External links

picard.fr

Food and drink companies established in 1906
Food and drink companies of France
Supermarkets of France
French brands
French companies established in 1906
Retail companies established in 1906